Komar is a rural locality (a selo) in Belovsky Selsoviet, Altaysky District, Altai Krai, Russia. The population was 193 as of 2013. There are 5 streets.

Geography 
Komar is located 30 km south of Altayskoye (the district's administrative centre) by road. Basargino is the nearest rural locality.

References 

Rural localities in Altaysky District, Altai Krai